Acraea hamata is a butterfly in the family Nymphalidae. It is found in the Democratic Republic of the Congo (from the eastern part of the country to Kivu), Uganda (from the south-western art of the country to Kigezi), Rwanda and Tanzania.

Taxonomy
It is a member of the Acraea terpsicore  species group   -   but see also Pierre & Bernaud, 2014

References

External links

Images representing Acraea hamata at Bold

Butterflies described in 1922
hamata